Charles W. Sydnor Jr. is a Holocaust and World War II historian. He served as the Virginia Holocaust Museum’s Executive Director. He published Soldiers of Destruction - The SS Death's Head Division, 1933-1945 in 1990.

References

Living people
Historians of the Holocaust
American military historians
Year of birth missing (living people)